Col. Gen. Lajos Fodor (born 27 July 1947) is a retired Hungarian military officer and diplomat, who served as the Chief of the General Staff of the Armed Forces of the Republic of Hungary from 1 August 1999 to 28 February 2003.

Career
Fodor functioned as First Deputy Chief of General Staff from 1996 to 1999, in this capacity, he had a significant role in Hungary's accession to the North Atlantic Treaty Organization (NATO). He served as Deputy Secretary of State for Defence Policy between 15 February and 31 July 1999, under Minister János Szabó. He suspended his military service for that short time. He was appointed Chief of the General Staff and promoted to Colonel General by President Árpád Göncz on 1 August 1999. He also served as Commander of the Hungarian Army until 2001, when the General Staff was integrated to the Ministry of Defence and the military's command function abolished. His relationship with the new Minister Ferenc Juhász has broken down in 2002. Ferenc Mádl acquitted him from his position on 28 February 2003. He was awarded Commander's Cross of the Order of Merit of the Republic of Hungary then.

After that he entered the diplomatic career, when he was appointed Hungarian Ambassador to Australia and New Zealand. He held that function until 2007. He became Secretary of State for Administration under Defence Minister Csaba Hende in the Second Cabinet of Viktor Orbán. He was replaced by István Dankó on 31 January 2013.

Promotions
Fodor's promotions according to his CV:
1970 – Lieutenant
1974 – Captain
1979 – Major
1983 – Lieutenant Colonel
1986 – Colonel
1992 – Major General
1997 – Lieutenant General
1999 – Colonel General

Decorations
 Order of John Hunyadi (2001)
 Commander's Cross of the Order of Merit of the Republic of Hungary (2003)

References

Sources
Official CV

1947 births
Living people
People from Debrecen
Hungarian military personnel
Hungarian politicians
Ambassadors of Hungary to Australia
Commander's Crosses with Star of the Order of Merit of the Republic of Hungary (military)